The Malabar vine snake (Ahaetulla malabarica), is a species of tree snake endemic to the southern portion of the central Western Ghats of India.

Taxonomy 
It was formerly considered conspecific with A. nasuta, which is now considered to only be endemic to Sri Lanka. A 2020 study found A. nasuta to be a species complex of A. nasuta sensu stricto as well as A. borealis, A. farnsworthi, A. isabellina, and A. malabarica.

Geographic range 
This species is distributed in the southern portion of the central Western Ghats, from the Palghat Gap in Tamil Nadu and Kerala north to Tadiandamol in Karnataka. A. farnsworthi is found to the north of the species' range and may be sympatric with it at Coorg (although largely separated by rivers), while A. isabellina is found to the south of the species' range, being separated from it by the Palghat Gap.

Habitat 
The species is found in mid-elevation evergreen forests in the Western Ghats from  ~650 to 1400 msl.

References 

Ahaetulla
Reptiles of India
Snakes of Asia
Endemic fauna of the Western Ghats
Reptiles described in 2020